Wizz Fizz is an Australian brand of sherbet manufactured by Fyna Foods Australia Pty Ltd.

Wizz Fizz is available in 12.5-gram sachets in the form of a very fine powder, and it is most commonly sold at convenience stores and supermarkets. Wizz Fizz is known for its small plastic shovel that allows consumption of the sherbet straight from the sachet.

History
Wizz Fizz packs from 1966 to 1996 had Disney characters, which from 2002 to 2007 were replaced with the characters "Screaming Mimi", "Weird Wally", "Gross Gus", "Nerdy Neil", 'Mad Myron', 'Kooky Kaz' and "Doctor Freak". In 2011, the Wizz Fizz packs were relaunched based on a planet theme with intricate illustrations.

Wizz Fizz has proved an enduring brand. Fyna Foods Australia Pty Ltd produces over 16 million sachets of Wizz Fizz each year from its Melbourne factory.

Products
Products in the Wizz Fizz range include:
Wizz Fizz Original Sherbet.
Wizz Fizz Black and Orange Tongue.
Sherbet Cones, introduced in the 1970s and consisting of a wafer cone with marshmallow, hundreds and thousands and sherbet.
Wizz Fizz Fizzy Fruity Pops Lollipops.
Wizz Fizz Fizzers (pack of 3) available in strawberry, cola, lemon and orange flavours.
Wizz Fizz Party Pack which contains a mix of Wizz Fizz Original Sherbet, Wizz Fizz Lollipops, Wizz Fizz Fizzers & Fads.

Products in the previous Wizz Fizz Range include:
Ring Fizz, which contained a ring in the packet.
Blue Tongue Sherbet.
Sour Sherbet.
Strawberry Sherbet.
Cola Wizz Fizz.
Hoppy Pops, lollipops with sherbet mixed inside them, featuring 'Hop-a-long Cassidy' on the packaging

Limited Edition Wizz Fizz Products include:
Wizz Fizz Easter Eggs available during Easter. consists of a milk chocolate egg with sherbet cream and popping candy centre.

References

External links 
 Official Wizz Fizz Website

Australian confectionery
Australian brands